Stage AE is a multi-purpose entertainment complex located in Pittsburgh, Pennsylvania, United States. It contains an indoor concert hall and an outdoor amphitheatre.  It is the second indoor/outdoor concert venue in America. Modeled after its predecessor, Express Live! in Columbus, the venue features state-of-the-art lighting, acoustical systems and an innovative reversible stage. Structurally, it is divided into three independent concert spaces: a music hall, club and outdoor amphitheater.

History
The complex sits adjacent to the Pittsburgh Steelers' Acrisure Stadium. The team, which held the rights to develop the land adjacent to the stadium (the site of the Steelers former home, Three Rivers Stadium), partially owns the venue along with Continental Real Estate Cos. of Columbus, Ohio. The cost of construction was $12 million, with $2.5 million funded from state taxes. Total space of the indoor venue is 22,000 square feet, while the outdoor lawns totals 30,000 square feet. When it opened, the complex was expected to host approximately 100 events per year. In June 2010, naming rights were granted to American Eagle Outfitters, a clothing retailer based in Pittsburgh's South Side neighborhood.

The venue opened in early December 2010 with two performances by Pittsburgh-native musician Girl Talk. Other performances in the first month included Cake and Anberlin, George Clinton and Parliament-Funkadelic, and Pittsburgh-natives Wiz Khalifa and The Clarks.

During the week before the 2011 NHL Winter Classic held at Heinz Field between the Pittsburgh Penguins and the Washington Capitals, the outdoor lawn of the venue held a skating rink that was open to the public. Leading up to the Steelers' hosting the 2011 AFC Championship game against the New York Jets, the venue hosted several concerts, parties, and rallies.

Noted performers

Music

Charlie Puth
Daya
Ellie Goulding
Goose
Cole Swindell
Kip Moore
The 1975
Relient K
Switchfoot
Grace Potter
Twenty One Pilots
Mac Miller
Opeth
Mastodon
Megadeth
Meshuggah
TesseracT
Hozier
Skrillex
George Clinton and the Parliament-Funkadelic
Cake
Iced Earth
Devo
Macklemore
My Morning Jacket
Neko Case
Jacob Sartorius
Kid Cudi
Wiz Khalifa
Girl Talk
Young the Giant
Marilyn Manson
Panic! at the Disco
Marina and The Diamonds
Walker Hayes
Dropkick Murphys
Third Eye Blind
The String Cheese Incident
Tech N9ne
August Burns Red
Between the Buried and Me
Ghost
G. Love & Special Sauce
Gaelic Storm
Umphrey's McGee
Sound Tribe Sector 9
Fitz and the Tantrums
Jack White
Arctic Monkeys
The National
ASAP Rocky
Lindsey Stirling
Gary Clark Jr.
Tenacious D
Parachute
Sara Bareilles
The Cab
The Shins
Nightwish
Walk the Moon
The Gin Blossoms
Trey Anastasio Band
Tonic
The Raconteurs
Weezer
Coheed and Cambria
The Decemberists
St. Vincent
Alice Cooper
Primus
Juice WRLD
The Kid LAROI
Pusha T
Baby Keem

Professional wrestling
The venue is also used for professional wrestling. WWE, which normally runs its shows at the PPG Paints Arena for the main roster when visiting Pittsburgh, uses the venue for live events for its NXT developmental brand while leaving PPG Paints Arena as a future option for NXT TakeOver events.

Ring of Honor has adopted Stage AE as its de facto home in Pittsburgh after previously using various venues in and around the area, including the David L. Lawrence Convention Center across the Allegheny River from the venue and as far away as Belle Vernon, California, Indiana, and Wheeling for shows, using college venues or (in Wheeling's case) WesBanco Arena for shows. ROH has had both live events and tapings for Ring of Honor Wrestling at Stage AE, including the Global Wars 2017 tour with New Japan Pro-Wrestling. (The latter marking NJPW's debut in Pittsburgh.) Local Fox affiliate WPGH-TV and MyNetworkTV affiliate WPNT, who are both owned by ROH parent Sinclair Broadcast Group and the latter the local home of Ring of Honor Wrestling, often serve as a sponsor for ROH at the venue.

See also
List of contemporary amphitheatres

External links

References

Amphitheaters in the United States
Music venues in Pittsburgh
Music venues completed in 2010
Wrestling venues in Pennsylvania